Jarret Zukiwsky (born December 7, 1972) is a Canadian former professional ice hockey player. During a professional career that spanned seven seasons and five different leagues, Zukiwsky played 200 regular season games scoring 77 goals and 153 points while racking up 747 minutes in penalties.

Awards and honours

Career statistics

References

External links

1972 births
Anchorage Aces players
Baton Rouge Kingfish players
Canadian ice hockey forwards
Corpus Christi Icerays players
Fresno Falcons players
SHC Fassa players
Idaho Steelheads (WCHL) players
Kamloops Blazers players
Living people
Mobile Mysticks players
Moose Jaw Warriors players
Nottingham Panthers players
San Antonio Iguanas players
San Diego Gulls (WCHL) players
Victoria Cougars (WHL) players
Tampa Bay Tritons players
Canadian expatriate ice hockey players in England
Canadian expatriate ice hockey players in Italy
Canadian expatriate ice hockey players in the United States